The Silicon Valley Football Classic (SVFC), sometimes referred to as the Silicon Valley Bowl or Silicon Valley Classic,  was an NCAA-certified Division I-A post-season college football bowl game that was played at Spartan Stadium on the South Campus of San Jose State University in San Jose, California, from 2000 to 2004. It had a contractual tie-in with the Western Athletic Conference and the Pac-10. The bowl was initially televised on Fox Sports Net and later moved to ESPN2.

History

2000

The Silicon Valley Bowl got off to a positive start as the 2000 game matched conference powers Air Force against Fresno State. The game drew about 85% of the stadium's capacity and fans saw an exciting 37–34 contest with one of the most memorable finishes of the year. With Air Force leading 37–34 with 14 seconds left, Fresno State faked a field goal, but holder Jason Simpson's pass to Giachino Chiaramonte fell incomplete in the end zone.

Destiny's Child performed at halftime.

2001

The 2001 edition proved to be just as entertaining as Big Ten power Michigan State accepted an invitation to play Fresno State. The game was a near sellout with over 30,000 fans in attendance. Michigan State defeated Fresno State 44–35 in a shootout that was the last college game for the first overall pick of the 2002 NFL Draft, David Carr. Carr threw for 531 yards and 4 touchdowns in a game that also featured future NFL players Jeff Smoker, Charles Rogers, TJ Duckett, and Bernard Berrian.

2002

In 2002 only 10,132 fans attended the third Silicon Valley Bowl, which featured Fresno State and Georgia Tech. The 2002 game was hampered by bad weather and a lack of fans compared to the previous years. Fresno State defeated Georgia Tech 30–21.

2003

In 2003, the UCLA Bruins accepted an invitation to the 2003 game against Fresno State. Attendance for the game was 20,126 fans, which was approximately 64% of stadium capacity. After the 2003 game, the NCAA instituted new rules for the 2004–05 Bowl Season stating that stadiums had to draw at least 70% of their capacity for bowl games in order to continue hosting them.

2004

The 2004 game marked the end of the bowl. Although the bowl once again had pre-season bowl tie-ins with the WAC and Pac-10, neither conference produced enough bowl-eligible teams to fulfill their obligations to the Classic. Although Fresno State's 8–3 record would normally have gained the Bulldogs an invitation to the game, WAC conference champion Boise State opted to play in the Liberty Bowl against Louisville, thus allowing 2nd-place Fresno to play in the Humanitarian Bowl against Virginia in a matchup that was normally reserved for the WAC conference champion.

Silicon Valley Bowl officials invited Northern Illinois of the MAC and Troy of the Sun Belt as at-large teams. The two schools fielded relatively low-profile teams that year, and both schools were located more than 2,000 miles away from the game's location. The two teams also represented two of the three lowest-ranked bowl eligible teams in the NCAA that season. The only other bowl eligible team that could have been picked was another team from the MAC in Akron. Although higher profile teams such as Clemson and South Carolina were also bowl eligible  both schools endured a self-imposed bowl ban that year because of a brawl that occurred between the two teams earlier in the season.

The 2004 Silicon Valley Bowl game took place during a severe thunderstorm that caused fans to not go to the game. Also, prior to the opening kickoff, the rain and wind caused an electrical transformer outside the stadium to malfunction, which caused two light stanchions inside the stadium to fail. There also were persistent problems with the television feed that included starting the game 23 minutes late. Game attendance was a series low at 5,494, which represented approximately 18% of Spartan Stadium's capacity.

The Classic was supposed to have a tie-in with the Pac-10 by offering an automatic berth to the 7th bowl eligible team in the conference. The Pac-10 and WAC tie-ins were supposed to make travel easier for fans of both bowl participants. However, during the bowl's five-year run, the Pac-10 conference only once produced enough bowl eligible teams to fill its spot in the game. The Classic received very little support from the local San Jose residents. Organizers hoped from the outset the host school would send its own San Jose Spartans to compete in the bowl, thus drawing attendance numbers up. Although the Spartans were bowl eligible in 2000, the bowl bid went to Fresno State because the Bulldogs finished with a better overall win–loss record.

Financial impact
Surprisingly, the 2004 game was a financial success. This was largely due to the bowl requiring each school to purchase 8,000 tickets at $45 each for a total payout to the bowl of $720,000. Furthermore, both schools accepted no upfront money to play in the game. Troy University had not yet appeared in a bowl game since moving to Division 1 in 2002 and Northern Illinois had not played in a bowl in 21 years. The advantage of featuring lower-profile programs in the 2004 Classic was that both schools were willing to make huge sacrifices just to appear in a nationally televised bowl game. Also, the city of San Jose and Hewlett-Packard each paid $100,000 to be named as primary bowl sponsors, and the WAC made a $300,000 commitment as well. The Classic also spent very little money on advertising. Despite the low attendance numbers, it was estimated the bowl netted a $200,000 profit in 2004. The bowl organizers planned to use these proceeds toward the 2005 game, which they hoped would bring more familiar west coast schools. City officials estimated the game brought roughly 6.4 million dollars to the San Jose economy annually through increased hotel bookings and dining in what bowl and city officials stated is normally the slowest tourism week of the year.

Official end
In the end, poor attendance figures were too much to overcome to keep the Classic alive. On April 20, 2005, it was announced the game's license would not be renewed by the NCAA and the Postseason Football Licensing Subcommittee. The SVFC was replaced by the Poinsettia Bowl in San Diego, California.

Game results
Rankings are based on the AP Poll prior to the game being played.

Note: The 2004 game featured a MAC vs. Sun Belt matchup- neither the Pac 10 or WAC was able to send a team.

Game MVPs

Most appearances

See also
List of college bowl games

References

 
Defunct college football bowls
Sports in San Jose, California
American football in California